The House of Buća (in Italian Bucchia) was a noble family that served the Republic of Ragusa, and one of the most important families to come out of Kotor. A cadet branch was admitted to the nobility of the Republic of Ragusa, another branch moved instead to Šibenik.

Name
The family is known in Serbo-Croatian sources as Buća,(Cyrillic: Бућа) but also as Bućić or Bučić. In Latin, Italian and French sources they are known in a variety of forms, mostly Bucchia or de Bucchia, but also Bucchich, Buchia, Buche, Buchi, Buchie, de Bucha, de Buchia, de Bucho, de Buça, Boce o Buca. Other versions found in Serbo-Croatian include Buča and Bućin.

History

Origin and early history

The family name seems to derive from the medieval name Buchius or Bucchius reported both in Dalmatia and earlier in various Italian locations. The first Bučić to be in the archives is a Jakov Bučić present in Kotor in 1186.

Service in Serbia
The first known Buća was Tripe Mihov (Trifun Buća, Трифун Бућа). Kotoran families held high offices in the Serbian court, and the most notable was the Buča family, while the most notable individual was Nikola Buća. Nikola and Toma Pavlov, another notable Kotoran, traded in salt.

The Buća were among the wealthiest and most powerful of Kotor (Kingdom of Serbia and Serbian Empire). Founded later with the House of Drago, it gave rise to one of the most important families in the region: the House of Drago-Bučić.

Service in the Republic of Ragusa
A branch of the family moved to Šibenik in 1449, while another branch had earlier moved to Dubrovnik in the 14th century. The latter, between 1440 and 1640 counted 30 members of the Great Council, representing 1.36% of total. In these two hundred years, they also got 27 senatorial positions (1.36%), five Rectors of the Republic (0.21%), five members of the Minor Council (0.23%), but were never Guards Justice.

Recent History 

Kotoran branch became extinct in the 17th century, the Dubrovnik in the 19th century, but the Šibenik branch still survives in Italy, precisely in Milan and Parma, respectively in the Bucchich and Peracchia - Bucchich families.

Members 

 Nikola Buća (14th century), protovestiarios of Serbian Emperor Stephen Dušan (r. 1331-1355). It seems he was the first member of the family to be admitted to the Ragusan nobility, as requested by the Emperor.
 Jeronim Bučić (16th century) - From Kotor, was Bishop of local diocese since 1581. He edited an adaptation of The Life of St. Tryphon, adding four hymns.
 Vincenc and Dominik Bučić (16th century) - Brothers from Kotor, both Dominicans, were popular theologians, leaving several published and unpublished writings. The second was the confessor of Blessed Osanna of Cattaro and General Vicar for Dalmatia.
 Vincenc Bučić (17th century) - Bishop of Kotor from 1622 to 1656.
 Gregorio Bucchich (Grgur Bučić) (1829 - 1911) - Born on the island of Hvar, he was a famous Croatian naturalist, in particular an expert in ichthyology and meteorology. He was the discoverer of the gobius bucchichi and was the first director of the meteorological station on the island of Hvar.

See also 
 Republic of Ragusa
 Dalmatia
 Kotor
 Dubrovnik
 Post-Roman patriciates

References

Sources

 Francesco Maria Appendini, Notizie istorico-critiche sulle antichità storia e letteratura de' Ragusei, Dalle stampe di Antonio Martecchini, Ragusa 1803
 Renzo de' Vidovich, Albo d'Oro delle famiglie nobili patrizie e illustri nel Regno di Dalmazia, Cultural Scientific Foundation Rustia Traine, Trieste 2004
 Simeon Gliubich,Biographical dictionary of illustrious Dalmatian men, wien-Zadar 1836
 Giorgio Gozzi,The free and sovereign Republic of Ragusa 634-1814, Volpe Editore, Rome 1981
 Robin Harris, Storia e vita di Ragusa - Dubrovnik, la piccola Repubblica adriatica, Santi Quaranta, Treviso 2008
 Konstantin Jireček, The Legacy of Rome in the cities of Dalmatia in the Middle Ages, 3 vols., AMSD, Rome 1984-1986

External links
Palace in Kotor 
Holiday Cabin in Tivat 

Ragusan noble families
Serbian noble families
14th-century Serbian people
14th-century merchants
15th-century merchants
Ragusan merchants
People from Kotor